Johann Josef Gabriel Netzer (18 March 1808 in Zams – 28 May 1864 in Graz) was an Austrian conductor and composer of early Romanticism.

Education 

Josef Netzer was born into a musical family: already his grandfather Blasius Netzer (*1725 in Pfunds, † 1785 in Bludenz) was an accomplished organist and well-known for his compositions. Josef received his first music lessons from his father Christian Netzer, a teacher and organist from Zams. Because his parents wanted him to become a priest, he was sent to Innsbruck to attend the "Gymnasium" (an academic highschool) at the age of 12. Alongside his school attendance he studied playing the piano at the Innsbrucker Musikverein with Martin Goller. After his graduation he settled in Vienna to work with Johann Gänsbacher and Simon Sechter, the teacher of Anton Bruckner. He also got acquainted with Franz Schubert in 1828. Netzer played some of his songs to Schubert and they also played piano duets.

Career 

In 1838 Netzer debuted with his compositions in the Wiener Hoftheater. The concert was a huge success and he got the opportunity to present his second symphony in E-Major in another concert. Because of this accomplishments Anton Diabelli printed his first songs "To the lute", "To the moon", "My luck" and "Hakon's song". In 1841  Netzer composed the opera "Mara", premiered at the "Wiener Hofoperntheater" (now Wiener Staatsoper) by the Hofopernorchester (now Vienna Philharmonic). The premiere was Netzers breakthrough and "Mara" is nowadays his most famous opus. He worked as conductor in Vienna (Theater an der Wien), Mainz, Leipzig and Graz (Graz Opera), where he conducted the first performance of an opera by Richard Wagner in the Austro-Hungarian Empire.

Notes 

1808 births
1864 deaths
Austrian conductors (music)
Austrian composers
19th-century composers
People from Zams